FNE may refer to

 Fane Airport in Papua New Guinea
 Fear of negative evaluation (also known as Atychiphobia)
 Federation of North-American Explorers
 Finance New Europe
 France Nature Environnement, a federation of environmental groups in France
 Free nerve ending
 National Federation of Energy, a former trade union in France